Adriana Fernández Miranda (born April 4, 1971) is a Mexican long-distance runner.

Fernández was 2nd in 1998, and in 1999, she became the first Mexican woman to win the New York City Marathon in a time of 2:25:06 in a dominant performance by taking charge on a windy day and kept building her lead.

In 2003, Fernández held Mexican records in the 5,000 meter run, the 10,000 meter run, the half marathon, and the marathon. Her personal best time in a marathon was established at the 1999 London Marathon, where her time was 2:24:06.  She represented her native country at three consecutive Summer Olympics, starting in 1996.

Personal bests
1500 Metres – 4:15.96 – Xalapa – 13/06/2003
3000 Metres – 8:53.53 – Portland, OR – 25/06/2000
5000 Metres – 15:04.32 – Gresham, OR – 17/05/2003
10,000 Metres – 31:10.12 – Brunswick, ME – 01/07/2000
20 Kilometres – 1:06:57 – Berlin – 29/09/2002
 Half Marathon – 1:09:28 – Kyoto – 09/03/2003
30 Kilometres – 1:40:51 – Berlin – 29/09/2002
 Marathon – 2:24:06 – London – 18/04/1999

References

External links

 
 PossoSports Profile
 MexicaliSport

1971 births
Living people
Mexican female long-distance runners
Olympic athletes of Mexico
Athletes (track and field) at the 1996 Summer Olympics
Athletes (track and field) at the 2000 Summer Olympics
Athletes (track and field) at the 2004 Summer Olympics
Athletes from Mexico City
Athletes (track and field) at the 1995 Pan American Games
Athletes (track and field) at the 1999 Pan American Games
Athletes (track and field) at the 2003 Pan American Games
New York City Marathon female winners
Pan American Games gold medalists for Mexico
Pan American Games medalists in athletics (track and field)
Central American and Caribbean Games gold medalists for Mexico
Central American and Caribbean Games bronze medalists for Mexico
Competitors at the 1998 Central American and Caribbean Games
Central American and Caribbean Games medalists in athletics
Medalists at the 1995 Pan American Games
Medalists at the 1999 Pan American Games
Medalists at the 2003 Pan American Games